Bandeep Singh (born 9 September 1989) is an Indian first-class cricketer who plays for Jammu & Kashmir. In October 2015, he broke the record of Yusuf Pathan and Shakti Singh for the fastest 50 in the Ranji Trophy. He hit the half-century in 15 balls while the earlier record was in 18 balls.

References

External links
 

1989 births
Living people
Indian cricketers
Jammu and Kashmir cricketers
People from Jammu